Otelo Ocampos Espínola (born 10 June 1983) is a Paraguayan footballer.

Honours

Club
Deportes Iquique
 Copa Chile: 2010
 Primera B: 2010

External links
 
 

1983 births
Living people
Paraguayan footballers
Paraguayan expatriate footballers
Club Sol de América footballers
Club Nacional footballers
Silvio Pettirossi footballers
River Plate (Asunción) footballers
Universidad de Concepción footballers
Deportes Iquique footballers
Coquimbo Unido footballers
Puerto Montt footballers
Chilean Primera División players
Primera B de Chile players
Expatriate footballers in Chile
Paraguayan expatriate sportspeople in Chile
Association football forwards